A crumble is a fruit-based dessert.

Crumble or Crumbles may also refer to:
 Eric Crumble, boxer
 The Crumbles, a shingle beach near Eastbourne
 Crumbles murders, either of two notable murder cases at The Crumbles in 1920 and 1924
"Crumble Cap" mushroom, fungus Coprinellus disseminatus

Food 

 Cookie Crumble, New Zealand ice cream
 Violet Crumble, Australian chocolate bar

Fiction 

 Crumble, a play by Sheila Callaghan
 Crumble (Transformers), a member of the Micromasters in Transformers
 The Great Crumble, an apocalyptic pandemic in Sweet Tooth (TV series)
 The Crumbles (illness), a fictional illness in HLVR:AI

Music 
 Crumble (album), 1994 indie rock music album by Butterglory
 "Crumble", 1996 song on the indie rock album Broken Girl by Julie Doiron
 "Crumble", 2003 song on the indie rock album Feast of Wire by Calexico

See also
 Crumb (disambiguation)
 Crumbling (disambiguation)